Natalio is a district in the Itapúa Department of Paraguay. It is located in the South-East of the country, with the town center located just 10 km from the Paraná River and the border with Argentina. The district lies 45 km off Route 6 which connects departmental capitals Encarnación and Ciudad del Este. The town is located in a fertile agricultural region. Local crops are soy, corn, wheat, tung, sorghum, and cotton. Natalio's slogan is "the Capital of Soy".

Sources 
World Gazeteer: Paraguay – World-Gazetteer.com

Districts of Itapúa Department